The Satilla Regional Library System is a public library system serving Atkinson County, and Coffee County, Georgia. The headquarters of the system is the Douglas-Coffee County Public Library located in Douglas, Georgia.

The library system is a member of PINES, a program of the Georgia Public Library Service that covers 53 library systems in 143 counties of Georgia. Any resident in a PINES supported library system has access to the system's collection of 10.6 million books. The library is also serviced by GALILEO, a program of the University System of Georgia which stands for "GeorgiA LIbrary LEarning Online". This program offers residents in supported libraries access to over 100 databases indexing thousands of periodicals and scholarly journals. It also boasts over 10,000 journal titles in full text.

Branches

Library systems in neighboring counties
Ocmulgee Regional Library System to the north.
Ohoopee Regional Library System to the north east.
Okefenokee Regional Library System to the east.
South Georgia Regional Library to the south.
Coastal Plain Regional Library System to the west.

References

External links
PINES Catalog

County library systems in Georgia (U.S. state)
Public libraries in Georgia (U.S. state)